Configuration design is a kind of design where a fixed set of predefined components that can be interfaced (connected) in predefined ways is given, and an assembly (i.e. designed artifact) of components selected from this fixed set is sought that satisfies a set of requirements and obeys a set of constraints.

The associated design configuration problem consists of the following three constituent tasks:
 Selection of components,
 Allocation of components, and
 Interfacing of components (design of ways the components interface/connect with each other).

Types of knowledge involved in configuration design include:

 Problem-specific knowledge:
 Input knowledge:
 Requirements
 Constraints
 Technology
 Case knowledge
 Persistent knowledge (knowledge that remains valid over multiple problem solving sessions):
 Case knowledge
 Domain-specific, method-independent knowledge
 Method-specific domain knowledge
 Search-control knowledge

See also 
 Systems design
 Modular design 
 Morphological analysis (problem-solving) 
 Constraint satisfaction problem

References 

 Mittal, S. and Frayman, F. (1989), Towards a generic model of configuration tasks, Proceedings of the 11th IJCAI, San Mateo, CA, USA, Morgan Kaufmann, pages 1395-1401.
 Levin, Mark Sh. (2015) Modular systems design and evaluation. Springer.
 B. Wielinga and G. Schreiber (1997), Configuration Design Problem Solving, IEEE Intelligent Systems, Vol. 12, pages 49–56.

Design